Capital Radio is a Sierra Leone radio station based at the Mammy Yoko Business Park in Aberdeen, Freetown.

History

Capital Radio was established as a company in Sierra Leone in 2005.  The station has 3 directors - Adonis Abboud, Colin Mason and David Stanley.  Test programmes commenced in May 2006 from the Cape Sierra Hotel using the newly installed transmitter at Leicester Peak. The full service started from studios in Wilkinson Road on 3 July 2006.  The station fully relocated to the Mammy Yoko Hotel complex in December 2011.

The station transmits from the SLBC Leicester Peak transmitting station using 104.9 MHz.  A relay in Bo, Sierra Leone, provides coverage of the city on 102.5 MHz.  A relay  was launched in Makeni in January 2012 using 103.3 MHz and for Kenema in May 2017 using 104.9 MHz.  The station also started streaming its broadcasts in July 2016.

Current Presenters/DJs

Zoe Hamilton (Station Manager)
Don J
Esther Farrell
Jessie Tucker
Nicky Spencer-Coker
Dinma Martins
Zenobia Kay
Eric Kawa
Yvonne Magbity

See also 
2014 Ebola virus epidemic in Sierra Leone (radio programs were used to inform people about the disease)

References

External links
Capital Radio
Capital Radio live stream page

Radio stations established in 2006
Contemporary hit radio stations
Radio stations in Sierra Leone
Freetown